The following list includes notable people who were born or have lived in St. Johnsbury, Vermont.

Artists and authors

Military

Politics

Professionals

Religion

Sports

References

St. Johnsbury
St. Johnsbury